Cosmognathia is a genus of worms belonging to the family Pterognathiidae.

The species of this genus are found in Northern Australia.

Species:

Cosmognathia aquila 
Cosmognathia arcus 
Cosmognathia bastillae 
Cosmognathia manubrium

References

Gnathostomulida
Platyzoa genera